Clarridge is a surname. Notable people with the surname include:

 Duane Clarridge (1932–2016), American CIA officer
 William Clarridge (active 19th century), British photographer

See also
 Claridge (surname)